Lee Jeong-hwa (born 1 December 1957) is a South Korean sports shooter. She competed in the women's 10 metre air rifle event at the 1984 Summer Olympics.

References

1957 births
Living people
South Korean female sport shooters
Olympic shooters of South Korea
Shooters at the 1984 Summer Olympics
Place of birth missing (living people)
20th-century South Korean women